Cyphoma aureocinctum, common name : the gold-banded egg shell, is a species of sea snail, a marine gastropod mollusc in the family Ovulidae, the ovulids, cowry allies or false cowries.

Distribution
This species occurs in the Atlantic Ocean along Cape Verde, West Africa, Southeast USA and Brazil.

Description
The shell size varies between 16 mm and 27 mm.

The maximum recorded shell length is 18.5 mm.

Habitat 
Minimum recorded depth is 123 m. Maximum recorded depth is 128 m.

References

Further reading 
 Rosenberg, G., F. Moretzsohn, and E. F. García. 2009. Gastropoda (Mollusca) of the Gulf of Mexico, Pp. 579–699 in Felder, D.L. and D.K. Camp (eds.), Gulf of Mexico–Origins, Waters, and Biota. Biodiversity. Texas A&M Press, College Station, Texas
 Cate, C. N. 1973. A systematic revision of the recent Cypraeid family Ovulidae. Veliger 15 (supplement): 1–117
 Lorenz F. & Fehse D. (2009). The Living Ovulidae - A manual of the families of Allied Cowries: Ovulidae, Pediculariidae and Eocypraeidae. Conchbooks, Hackenheim, Germany.

Ovulidae
Gastropods described in 1889
Molluscs of the Atlantic Ocean
Molluscs of Brazil
Gastropods of Cape Verde